"Apple Eyes" is a song by Australian band Swoop that was released in October 1995 as the third single from the group's second studio album, The Woxo Principle (1995). It was their most successful single, peaking at number nine on the Australian ARIA Singles Chart. The single was certified gold by Australian Recording Industry Association (ARIA) for shipments exceeding 35,000 copies. At the ARIA Music Awards of 1996, the song was nominated for Song of the Year and Best Video.

Background 

Australian funk music group Swoop released their second studio album The Woxo Principle in November 1995, which was preceded by its third single, "Apple Eyes" in October. The band had signed with Mushroom Records in the previous year, which issued two earlier singles, "Neighbourhood Freak" (November) and "Rock Dog" (August 1995. The line-up for the album and associated singles was Joshua Beagley on electric and acoustic guitars, Chris Brien on drums, bells, tambourine and voices, Armando Gomez on wood block, Alex Hewetson on bass guitar, Roland Kapferer on lead vocals, Brendan St Ledger on piano, electric pianos, organ, [[clavinet), synthesisers, xylophone, mellotron and talk box and Fiona Ta'akimoeaka on lead vocals.

"Apple Eyes" was co-written by Beagley, Kapferer, Hewetson and Ta'akimoeaka. Co-producers of the track are Beagley, Kapferer, Ashley Cadell and Robbie Rowlands. It is the highest charting single by Swoop, which peaked at No. 9 on the ARIA singles chart in January 1996.

Music video

"Angel Eyes" music video depicts the band playing on a black and white checkerboard hovering above an ocean in a surreal CGI landscape.

Track listing

Charts

Weekly charts

Year-end charts

Certifications

References

1995 singles
1995 songs
Mushroom Records singles
Swoop (Australian band) songs